Mandrin is a 1924 French silent historical adventure film directed by Henri Fescourt and starring Romuald Joubé, Johanna Sutter and  Hugues de Bagratide. It is based on the life of the eighteenth century brigand Louis Mandrin.

Cast
 Romuald Joubé as Mandrin
 Johanna Sutter as Tiennot
 Hugues de Bagratide as Pistolet 
 Louis Monfils as De Malicet
 Jacqueline Blanc as Nicole Malicet
 Madame Ahnar as Mme Malicet
 Jeanne Helbling as 	Mme de Pompadour	
 Charles Leclerc as D'Argenson
 Gilbert Dalleu as 	De la Morlière
 Andrée Valois as Martine
 Marcelle Rahna as La Camargo
 Paul Guidé as Bouret d'Erigny
 Émile Saint-Ober as Mi-Carême 
 Paul Bernier as Carnaval
 Bardès as Voltaire

See also
Mandrin (1947)
Mandrin (1962)

References

Bibliography 
 Oscherwitz, Dayna & Higgins, MaryEllen. The A to Z of French Cinema. Scarecrow Press, 2009.

External links 
 

1924 films
French historical adventure films
1920s historical adventure films
French silent films
1924 adventure films
1920s French-language films
Films directed by Henri Fescourt
Pathé films
1920s French films
Silent historical adventure films